Harry Albemarle Swepstone (14 January 1859 – 7 May 1907) was an English international footballer, who played as a goalkeeper.

Career
Born in Stepney, Swepstone played club football for Clapton, Pilgrims, Ramblers, Corinthian and Swifts.

He earned six caps for England between 1880 and 1883. Nicknamed the 'Little Pilgrim' by the press, Swepstone has the dubious distinction of conceding 18 goals in just six international matches as England goalkeeper, despite keeping two clean sheets, after making his debut in a 5–4 defeat to Scotland at Hampden Park.

Swepstone was a founder-member of the famous amateur team Corinthian, established in 1882, and is credited as suggesting the team's name.

References

1859 births
1907 deaths
English footballers
England international footballers
Clapton F.C. players
Corinthian F.C. players
Swifts F.C. players
Association football goalkeepers
Pilgrims F.C. players